Synetskyi is a rural settlement (posyolok) in Sievierodonetsk Raion of Luhansk Oblast of eastern Ukraine, at about 110 km NW from the centre of Luhansk city, on the left bank of the Siverskyi Donets river.

The settlement was shelled by Russian forces attacking Sievierodonetsk from the west in May 2022, during the Russian invasion of Ukraine.

References

Villages in Sievierodonetsk Raion